R06 may refer to:
 HMS Illustrious (R06)
 ATC code R06
 HMS Centaur (R06)